Suburban Wildlife is a 2019 Australian independent coming-of-age drama film directed by Imogen McCluskey in her feature film debut. It was written by McCluskey and Béatrice Barbeau-Scurla. The film stars Maddy McWilliam, Hannah Lehmann, Priscilla Doueihy, and Alex King. It had its world premiere on 9 March 2019 at the Cinequest Film Festival in California.

Plot 
Nina, Louise and Alice are recent university graduates living in Sydney. They celebrate their graduation with Kane, their high school friend who didn't attend university. The mood is dampened as the group struggles to come to terms with Louise's impending move to London for two years. Louise convinces the others to join her on a road trip into regional New South Wales before she leaves. Tensions continue to rise as the friends question what their relationships will be like after Louise moves away.

Cast 

 Maddie McWilliam as Nina
 Hannah Lehmann as Louise
 Priscilla Doueihy as Alice
 Alex King as Kane
 Adrian Giribon as Ravi
 Madeleine Jurd as Phoebe
 Emily Havea as Aleea
 Daniela Haddad as Flora
 Adam Kovarik as Dylan
 Divya Vaman as Shivani

Production 
Suburban Wildlife's production budget of AU$4,000 was raised through crowdfunding efforts. Principal photography took place in February 2017 and lasted fourteen days.

Release 
Suburban Wildlife had its world premiere at the Cinequest Film Festival on 9 March 2019. It later had its Australian premiere at the Sydney Film Festival on 8 June 2019. In 2020, US film distributor Gravitas Ventures picked up the film for digital distribution. It became available internationally for video-on-demand rental on 1 December 2020.

References 

2019 drama films
2019 independent films
Australian drama films
Australian independent films
Films set in Sydney
2019 directorial debut films